Park Saebyul (born October 24, 1985) is a South Korean indie singer-songwriter.

Life and career 
Park Saebyul was born in Seoul and graduated from Yonsei University in 2010 with a major in psychology. 
Before her debut, she served as a keyboard session for stages and album of Lucid Fall. 
In 2008, she released her first mini-album 《Diary》, and in March 2010, the first regular album 《새벽별 (Morning Star)》 written and produced by herself was released.
As a radio DJ, she hosted "아름다운 동요세상 (Beautiful World of Children's Songs)" on the education channel EBS from March 6, 2011 to February 28, 2012. Saebyul also contributes of dubbing the singing voice of main characters in Disney films. In 2007 she provided the singing voice of Giselle in the Korean dubbing of Enchanted, and in 2010 she provided the singing voice of Rapunzel in the Korean dubbing of Tangled in all the songs, except for Healing Incantation. In 2014 she sang for the Korean dubbing of Tinker Bell and the Legend of the NeverBeast.

Discography

Studio albums

Extended plays

Singles

Broadcasting
 "아름다운 동요세상 (Beautiful World of Children's Songs)" on EBS FM radio (March 6, 2011 ~ February 28, 2012)
 MC of "문화콘서트 난장 (Culture concert, Nanjang)" on Gwangju MBC (2009)

Web shows

See also 
 Antenna Music

References

External links 
 Park Saebyul's Cyworld club
 

1985 births
Living people
K-pop singers
People from Seoul
South Korean women pop singers
South Korean pop pianists
South Korean women pianists
South Korean singer-songwriters
Yonsei University alumni
KAIST alumni
Antenna Music artists
21st-century South Korean singers
21st-century South Korean women singers
21st-century pianists
South Korean women singer-songwriters
20th-century women pianists
21st-century women pianists